KHAY (100.7 FM, "100.7 KHAY") is a commercial radio station that is licensed to Ventura, California and broadcasts to the Oxnard—Ventura area. The station is owned by Cumulus Media and airs a country music format featuring programming from Nash FM.

History
The station signed on January 1, 1962, as KVEN-FM and simulcast the middle of the road music format of its AM counterpart KVEN. In 1965, Carroll R. Houser sold KVEN-AM-FM to a group consisting of Ira Laufer, Robert L. Fox, and Greater California Capital Corporation — collectively doing business as KVEN Broadcasting Corporation — for $500,000.

In October 1973, KVEN-FM changed its call sign to KHAY and adopted a country music format. It was the first FM country station in California to broadcast in stereo.

In August 1996, McDonald Media Group purchased KHAY and KVEN for $12.7 million. In December 1999, Cumulus Media purchased McDonald Media Group's eight stations, including KHAY, for $41 million.

KHAY carries programming from the Nash FM country music network, which is also owned by Cumulus. As such, the station carries a variety of syndicated programming, including Nights with Elaina and The Blair Garner Show. However, due to its heritage status, KHAY is exempt from most of Nash FM's compulsory branding components of those stations.

Awards and nominations
On February 7, 2018, KHAY received its first-ever nominations for the Academy of Country Music's annual Radio Awards, honoring excellence in country radio. The award ceremony was held April 14 in conjunction with, and the day before, the 53rd ACM Awards in Las Vegas but was not televised. KHAY won one award that year.

References

External links
 
 
 

HAY
Country radio stations in the United States
Cumulus Media radio stations